Soldier's Joy is a historic house located at Wingina, Nelson County, Virginia, USA. It was built in 1784–85 by Col. Samuel Jordan Cabell and enlarged approximately twenty-five years later.  Along with Bon Aire and Montezuma, it is one of the few remaining Cabell family houses in Nelson County.  When constructed it was a five-part Palladian house; reduced in size during the 20th century when the early 19th-century wings were moved. The Late-Georgian dwelling is distinguished by its fine proportions and interior detailing, much of which was added when the house was enlarged. The elaborate woodwork from the ballroom wing was removed to the Cincinnati Art Museum when the house was renovated in the 1920s.

It was listed on the National Register of Historic Places in 1980.

References

Houses in Nelson County, Virginia
Houses completed in 1784
Georgian architecture in Virginia
Palladian Revival architecture in Virginia
Plantation houses in Virginia
Houses on the National Register of Historic Places in Virginia
National Register of Historic Places in Nelson County, Virginia
Cabell family